Grand Hôtel is a five-star hotel in Stockholm. It was founded by Frenchman, Jean-François Régis Cadier, in 1872.  It opened on 14 June 1874 at the same time as the Grand Hotel in Oslo; all the Scandinavian capitals have a major hotel called 'Grand Hotel'. The Grand Hôtel is located next to the Nationalmuseum and opposite the Royal Palace and Gamla stan (the old town). Since 1901, the Nobel Prize laureates and their families have traditionally been guests at the hotel, as well as several celebrities and world leaders.

Grand Hôtel Stockholm has 300 rooms and 31 suites, 24 banquet and conference rooms, two restaurants, a bar and a spa (Nordic Spa & Fitness). One of the restaurants is managed by the Swedish chef, Mathias Dahlgren. The hotel is the only Swedish member of The Leading Hotels of the World. The hotel is owned by the Swedish Wallenberg family via Investor AB.

References

External links

Hotel web site
Grand Hôtel history
The Leading Hotels of the World
 InterContinental Hotel & Resorts
Grand Hôtel Stockholm Description

Hotels in Stockholm
Companies related to the Wallenberg family
Purveyors to the Court of Sweden
Hotels established in 1874
1874 establishments in Sweden